Revolt of Don's Knights (Slovakian: Vzbura Dónskych Rytierov) is a 1996 role-playing video game for MS-DOS by Emerald Software.

Reception
Dungeon Crawlers felt it wasn't a particularly good example of the genre.

Legacy
A contest based around the game was held fifteen years after its release in 2013.

References

External links
 Bit preview
 Score review

1996 video games
DOS games
DOS-only games
Europe-exclusive video games
Role-playing video games
Video games developed in Slovakia